Paweł Finder (born as Pinkus Finder; pseudonyms: Paul Finder, Paul Reynot; 19 September 1904 – 26 July 1944) was a Polish Communist leader and First Secretary of the Polish Workers' Party (PPR) from 1943 to 1944.

Early life
Finder came from an affluent Jewish shopkeeping family in Bielitz, where he was educated. He briefly flirted with Zionism while still at school and visited Palestine. He studied chemistry in Vienna, Mulhouse and Paris. A chemical engineer, he was a researcher at the Conservatoire national des arts et métiers and was an assistant to Frédéric Joliot-Curie.

Communist Party activist 
From 1922 to 1924 he was a member of the Austrian Communist Party, and from 1924 to 1928 of the French Communist Party, serving in the Central Committee apparatus and writing articles for l'Humanité. He was expelled from France for Communist activity in 1928 and returned to Poland. He completed military service in officer school. He was active in the underground Communist Party of Poland (KPP) until his arrest in 1934, serving as secretary in Silesia, Łódź, Warsaw and Kraków, and as a member of the National Secretariat in 1933.  

He was arrested in 1934 and sentenced to 12 years' imprisonment.  During the German and Soviet invasions of Poland in September 1939 he was able to flee Rawicz prison and went to the Soviet Union. He worked in the planning commission of the local authority established in Soviet-occupied Białystok, becoming its chairman early in 1941. Finder fled to Moscow when the Germans invaded and directed to the Comintern training school as a leader of the 'initiative group' formed to re-establish the Communist movement in Poland. On 27 December 1941 he parachuted into Poland. In the troika that formed and led the PPR (with Marceli Nowotko and Bolesław Mołojec), he provided intellectual and ideological support for Nowotko. He succeeded him as secretary in January 1943, following the murder of Nowotko and the subsequent execution of Mołojec.

Arrest and death 
Finder was arrested by the Gestapo on 14 December 1943 and imprisoned in Pawiak. He was identified, tortured and shot by the Nazis in the ruins of the Warsaw ghetto as they evacuated and demolished Pawiak in July 1944.

His first wife, by whom he had a daughter, died in France in the 1920s.
His second wife, Gertruda Finder, was a KPP activist and worked in the Polish security apparatus after the war.

Notes

1904 births
1944 deaths
People from Bielsko
People from the Kingdom of Galicia and Lodomeria
Jewish Polish politicians
Communist Party of Poland politicians
Polish Workers' Party politicians
People who died in the Warsaw Ghetto
Deaths by firearm in Poland
Polish civilians killed in World War II